Liu Jun (born 15 October 1969) is a Chinese former basketball player who competed in the 1992 Summer Olympics and in the 1996 Summer Olympics.

References

1969 births
Living people
Chinese women's basketball players
Basketball players from Hebei
Basketball players at the 1992 Summer Olympics
Basketball players at the 1996 Summer Olympics
Medalists at the 1992 Summer Olympics
Olympic basketball players of China
Olympic silver medalists for China
Olympic medalists in basketball
Asian Games medalists in basketball
Basketball players at the 1994 Asian Games
Asian Games bronze medalists for China
Medalists at the 1994 Asian Games